Noah Frommelt (born 18 December 2000) is a Liechtensteiner footballer who plays as a midfielder for FC Kosova Zürich and the Liechtenstein national team.

Career
Frommelt made his international debut for Liechtenstein on 18 November 2019, coming on as a 67th-minute substitute in the UEFA Euro 2020 qualifying match against Bosnia and Herzegovina, which finished as a 0–3 home loss.

Career statistics

International

References

External links
 
 
 

2000 births
Living people
Liechtenstein footballers
Liechtenstein youth international footballers
Liechtenstein under-21 international footballers
Liechtenstein international footballers
Association football midfielders
FC Balzers players
Swiss 1. Liga (football) players
2. Liga Interregional players